Geerlane is a hamlet in North East Derbyshire, England.

The hamlet is located in Moss Valley, by the side of The Moss. It has a farm, called Geerlane Farm, where a farmer was killed in 2010 after being trampled on by his cattle.

There was formerly a small quarry in Geerlane which provided the hamlet's main source of employment. Since its closure, the local economy has been based around farming.

References

Hamlets in Derbyshire
North East Derbyshire District